Commissioner and Director of Municipal Administration, Andhra Pradesh (C&DMA-AP) is the head of Directorate of Municipal Administration, Government of Andhra Pradesh, which is the one of the main organization under Municipal Administration and Urban Development Department of Government of Andhra Pradesh.

Its oversees the urban local body related activities such as, civic administration, tax collection and other civic amenities etc. The present Commissioner and Director is Shri Pravin Kumar, IAS.

References

State agencies of Andhra Pradesh
Local government in Andhra Pradesh
Government departments of Andhra Pradesh